The 106th Massachusetts General Court, consisting of the Massachusetts Senate and the Massachusetts House of Representatives, met in 1885 during the governorship of George D. Robinson. Albert E. Pillsbury served as president of the Senate and John Q. A. Brackett served as speaker of the House.

In 1885 the legislature officialized the state coat of arms and seal. Other notable legislation included an "Act to Protect Persons Using Public Libraries From Disturbance."

Senators

Representatives

 Julius Caesar Chappelle

See also
 49th United States Congress
 List of Massachusetts General Courts

References

Further reading
 
  (includes description of legislature)

External links
 
 

Political history of Massachusetts
Massachusetts legislative sessions
massachusetts
1885 in Massachusetts